Diego Martínez Macarro (born 20 March 1989), simply known as Dieguito is a Spanish professional footballer who plays for Mons Calpe in the Gibraltar Premier Division.

Club career
He played for Cádiz B between 2008 and 2010. After being promoted to the first team, he made 30 appearances for the side before joining Asteras Magoula in 2013.

Lincoln Red Imps

A few years in the lower leagues of Spain ended with a January 2017 move to Gibraltar Premier Division giants Lincoln Red Imps, who earlier in the season had earned a shock victory over Celtic in the UEFA Champions League. He scored on his debut, coming off the bench in a 15-0 demolition of Europa Point.

References

External links
 

1989 births
Living people
Association football midfielders
Spanish footballers
Cádiz CF B players
Cádiz CF players
Lincoln Red Imps F.C. players
Mons Calpe S.C. players
Segunda División B players
Football League (Greece) players